Raúl Vicente Villarreal (born October 29, 1909, date of death unknown) was an Argentine boxer who competed in the 1936 Summer Olympics.

In 1936 he won the bronze medal in the middleweight class after winning the third-place fight against Henryk Chmielewski of Poland.

1936 Olympic results

 Round of 32: bye
 Round of 16: defeated Hans Zehetmayer (Austria) on points
 Quarterfinal: defeated Tim Dekkers (Netherlands) on points
 Semifinal: lost to Jean Despeaux (France) on points
 Bronze-Medal Bout: defeated Henryk Chmielewski (Poland) by walkover (was awarded the bronze medal)

References
Raúl Villarreal's profile at databaseOlympics.com
Raúl Villarreal's profile at Sports Reference.com

1909 births
Year of death missing
Boxers at the 1936 Summer Olympics
Middleweight boxers
Olympic boxers of Argentina
Olympic bronze medalists for Argentina
Olympic medalists in boxing
Argentine male boxers
Medalists at the 1936 Summer Olympics